Abraham Whalomie Raygorodsky (June 4, 1884 - ?) was Russian-American aviation pioneer.

Biography
He was born on June 4, 1884, in Russia. He trained at the Farman flying school in Paris and received his pilot's certificate from the Aero Club of France around 1910. He then emigrated to the United States. In 1914 he attempted to win a $50,000 prize from Alfred Harmsworth, 1st Viscount Northcliffe. His Daily Mail aviation prize was for the first transatlantic flight.

References

1884 births
Year of death missing
Aviators from the Russian Empire
Russian Jews
Emigrants from the Russian Empire to the United States